"When You See Millions of the Mouthless Dead", also known as "The Army of Death", "The Dead", or "A Sonnet", is a poem by Charles Sorley, a British Army officer and Scottish war poet who fought in the First World War. At age 20, Sorley was killed in action near Hulluch, having been shot in the head by a sniper during the final offensive of the Battle of Loos on 13 October 1915. This, Sorley's last poem, was recovered from his kit after his death. It was untitled, and so is commonly known by its incipit, or other titles.

It is generally interpreted as a rebuttal to Rupert Brooke's 1915 sonnet "The Soldier.", which begins "If I should die, think only this of me: / That there's some corner of a foreign field / That is for ever England."

Legacy

It Is Easy To Be Dead by Neil McPherson, a play on Sorley's life, based on his poetry and letters, was presented at the Finborough Theatre, London, and subsequently at Trafalgar Studios, London, in 2016 where it was nominated for an Olivier Award. It subsequently toured to Glasgow and Sorley's birthplace, Aberdeen, in 2018.

On 9 November 2018, an opinion commentary by Aaron Schnoor published in The Wall Street Journal honored the poetry of World War I, including Sorley's poem "When You See Millions of the Mouthless Dead".

References

External links 

 "When You See Millions of the Mouthless Dead" on Librivox
 "The Army of Death" on Librivox

1917 poems
War poetry
World War I poems